Attagenus brunneus is a 2.9–5mm long species of carpet beetle in the family Dermestidae, found in North America and Europe. It is a detritovorous alien invasive species in Europe, living in buildings.

References

Further reading

 
 

Dermestidae
Articles created by Qbugbot
Beetles described in 1835